Mitro was a password manager for individuals and teams that securely saved users' logins, and allowed users to log in and share access.

On October 6, 2015, the Mitro service shut down.

The successor to Mitro is named Passopolis; this is a password manager built upon the Mitro source code.

History
Mitro was founded in 2012 by Vijay Pandurangan, Evan Jones, and Adam Hilss.

On July 31, 2014, the Mitro team announced that they would join Twitter, and at the same time, they released the source code for Mitro on GitHub as free software under GPL.

The Mitro team announced the shuttering of the Mitro service with the following timeline:
 July 11, 2015: Initial announcement that Mitro would be shut down
 July 18, 2015: Creating new accounts was disabled
 August 4, 2015: Final email warning about imminent shutdown was sent
 September 24, 2015: Mitro become read-only
 October 6, 2015: Mitro service was turned off
 October 31, 2015: All Mitro user data permanently destroyed

The Mitro team explained the reason for shutting down the service was that the cost and administrative burden to maintain the service in their spare time with their own money had become too much. Given that they could not properly manage a service that people rely on for their security, they needed to stop running it.

Former customers were encouraged to move to Passopolis, and independent project that uses the open source Mitro code, or use alternatives such as 1Password, Dashlane, or LastPass.

On October 5, 2015, Mitro was officially terminated by Twitter.

Investors

Seed Funding
Mitro was backed by $1.2 million in seed funding from Google Ventures and Matrix Partners.

Features
 Password generator
 Password sharing
 One-click login
 Two factor authentication
 Cross-platform and cross-browser compatibility
 Browser extensions: Chrome, Firefox, Safari
 Mobile solutions for Android and iOS

Security
Mitro uses Google's Keyczar on the server and Keyczar JS implementation on the browser.
 Master key is a 128-bit AES key derived using PBKDF2 (SHA-1; 50000 iterations; 16 salt bytes)
 RSA with 2048-bit keys using OAEP-SHA1 (separate signing and encryption keys)
 AES with 128-bit keys in CBC mode with PKCS5 padding
 All encrypted data includes a MAC (HMAC-SHA1)

See also

 Comparison of password managers
 List of password managers
 Password manager
 Cryptography

Notes

References

External links 

Source code

American companies established in 2012
Computer security software companies
Cryptographic software
Free password managers
Free software programmed in C
Software companies based in New York (state)
Twitter, Inc. acquisitions
2014 mergers and acquisitions
2012 establishments in New York (state)
Software companies established in 2012